Katepwa Point Provincial Park is located along the eastern shore of Katepwa Lake in the southern portion of the Canadian province of Saskatchewan, adjacent to the resort village of Katepwa. The park's primary feature is a large beach, which is complemented by a large lawn, boat launch, and picnic facilities. At only five hectares in size, it is among the smallest of Saskatchewan's provincial parks.

The park was established by the Canadian federal government in 1921 as Vidal Point Dominion Park. In 1930, the Government of Canada transferred the responsibility for Saskatchewan's natural resources to the province. As such, Vidal Point fell under the jurisdiction of the newly created Saskatchewan Parks Branch in 1931 and was renamed Katepwa Point Provincial Park. It was one of the six original provincial parks in Saskatchewan, the others being Moose Mountain, Duck Mountain, Cypress Hills, Good Spirit Lake Provincial Park, and Little Manitou.

Saskatchewan Highway 56 provides access to the park as it travels along the Qu'Appelle Valley and the Fishing Lakes.

Attractions
The main attraction for the park is the beach. The beach is located in the southern shore of Katepwa Point, on the south side of Katepwa Beach. Besides the beach, there's a picnic area, playground, and a boat launch. Activities at the park include swimming, fishing, boating, and various other water related activities.

In the winter, there's snowmobiling, cross-country skiing, skating, and ice fishing.

Amenities near the park include a golf course, mini-golf, hotel, cabins, licensed dining, and hiking.

See also
List of protected areas of Saskatchewan
Tourism in Saskatchewan
Fishing Lakes

References

External links 

Provincial parks of Saskatchewan
Division No. 6, Saskatchewan